Henri Ramirez is a French-Brazilian linguist known especially for his research on Arawakan languages and other language families of the Amazonian region. He is currently a professor at the Federal University of Rondônia, Guajará-Mirim.

Education
Born in Algeria (then part of France), Ramirez graduated with a master's degree in Engineering from the École Centrale des Arts et Manufactures in 1977. Afterwards, he obtained a Bachelor's, Master's, and doctorate degree at the University of Provence. He has lived among the Yanomami people for years and documented their language in various dissertations and monographs.

Selected works

Monographs
Ramirez mainly publishes monographs. One of his best-known books is Línguas Arawak da Amazônia Setentrional: Comparação e Descrição (2001). Others include:

Enciclopédia das línguas Arawak: acrescida de seis novas línguas e dois bancos de dados (2020)
A Língua dos Hupd'äh do Alto Rio Negro: dicionário e guia de conversação (2006)
As línguas indígenas do Alto Madeira: estatuto atual e bibliografia básica (2006)
Dicionário da Língua Baniwa (2001)
A Fala Tukano dos Ye'pâ-Masa (1997)
Le Bahuana: une nouvelle langue de la famille arawak (1992)

Articles
Koropó, puri, kamakã e outras línguas do Leste Brasileiro (Ramirez, Vegini & França 2015)
O warázu do Guaporé (tupi-guarani): primeira descrição linguística (Ramirez, Vegini & França 2017)

Dissertations
Le Parler Yanomamɨ des Xamatauteri (1994)
Une nouvelle langue de la famille Arawak (1992)
Aspects de la morpho-syntaxe du Yanomamɨ (1991)

References

External links
Biblioteca Digital Curt Nimuendajú
Google Scholar

Living people
Linguists of Arawakan languages
Linguists from Brazil
University of Provence alumni
Linguists of indigenous languages of South America
Historical linguists
Ethnobiologists
Year of birth missing (living people)